Early general elections for both the Prime Minister and the Knesset were held in Israel on 17 May 1999 following a vote of no confidence in the government; the incumbent Likud Prime Minister Benjamin Netanyahu, ran for re-election.

This election was only the second time in Israeli history an election had been held for the Prime Minister's post in addition to elections for the Knesset. The first such election, in 1996 had been an extremely tight contest between Likud's Benjamin Netanyahu on the right, and Labor's Shimon Peres on the left; the right had won by less than one percent (about 29,000 votes).

Ehud Barak, promising to storm the citadels of peace regarding negotiations with the Palestinians and withdraw from Lebanon by July 2000, won the election in a landslide victory.

Background

Wye River Memorandum

In the Israeli–Palestinian peace process, although the Likud government had negotiated the Wye River Memorandum and it had passed the Knesset overwhelmingly in November 1998, subsequent negotiations with the Palestinians were going badly. The lack of progress had alienated support for the government on the left, as well as on its right. The left claimed negotiations were moving too slowly, while the more extreme right were unhappy with the contemplated territorial concessions included in the memorandum itself.

Disintegration of the Likud–Gesher–Tzomet alliance
The Likud–Gesher–Tzomet alliance had fallen apart, with more members leaving Likud to set up Herut – The National Movement and the Centre Party.

Netanyahu's government finally gave up the ghost due to difficulties in passing the state budget and in January 1999 passed a bill calling for early elections.

Establishment of the One Israel alliance
Ehud Barak, the leader of the main opposition Labor Party, was Netanyahu's main contender in this election. Before the elections, Ehud Barak's Labor Party formed an alliance with Gesher and Meimad called One Israel in the hope that a united front on the centre-left would give them enough seats to form a more stable coalition.

The ongoing South Lebanon conflict

The rising death toll and lack of military victory in Israel's long-running occupation in south Lebanon had soured voter support for the Likud policy.

Campaign
Initially, three other candidates planned to run; these included: Benny Begin of Herut – The National Movement, running to the right of Likud; Azmi Bishara of the Israeli Arab Balad party, running to the left of One Israel and the first from that minority to stand for Prime Minister, and; Yitzhak Mordechai of the Centre Party, running on positions between those of Likud on the right and One Israel on the left.

Over the course of the campaign however, Begin, Bishara, and Mordechai all dropped out of the race for Prime Minister, after it became clear that they could not win, and that their continued presence would cost votes for the major candidates, Barak and Netanyahu, at their respective ends of the political spectrum. The parties these other candidates represented however, continued to run in the concurrent Knesset elections.

Two parties, Manhigut Yehudit and Voice of the Environment, initially signed up to participate in the elections, but withdrew their candidacy before election day.

Results

Prime Minister

Knesset

Yisrael Beiteinu gained a seat after the vote-sharing process was completed.

Aftermath
Although Barak won the Prime Ministerial election comfortably, his One Israel alliance won only 26 seats, meaning he had to form a convoluted coalition with Shas, Meretz, Yisrael BaAliyah, the Centre Party, the National Religious Party and United Torah Judaism.

When Barak's government collapsed after the start of the Second Intifada and the October Israeli Arab riots in 2000, Barak called new elections for Prime Minister in the hope of winning an authoritative mandate. However, he was well-beaten by Ariel Sharon and subsequently resigned from politics.

15th Knesset

After winning the Prime Ministerial elections, Ehud Barak formed the 28th government of Israel on 6 July 1999. His coalition included One Israel, Shas, Meretz, Yisrael BaAliyah, the Centre Party, the National Religious Party and United Torah Judaism, and initially had 16 ministers, though the number later rose to 24. Avraham Burg was appointed as Speaker of the Knesset.

United Torah Judaism left the coalition in September 1999 after a breach of the Sabbath. The government finally collapsed on 10 December 2000 when Barak resigned in the face of the outbreak of the Second Intifada and the Israeli Arab riots of October. Barak called new elections for the position of Prime Minister, which he lost to Ariel Sharon.

Sharon formed the 29th government on 7 March 2001. He set up a national unity government, including Likud, Labor-Meimad, Shas, the Centre Party, the National Religious Party, United Torah Judaism, Yisrael BaAliyah, and National Union-Yisrael Beiteinu. Sharon's government had 26 ministers, which later rose to 29, necessitating the addition of a small table to the end of the Ministers row in the Knesset.

During the Knesset term, there were several splits, mergers, and defections. The One Israel alliance broke into its constituent parts, Labor-Meimad (25 seats) and Gesher (2 seats). Five members left the Centre Party, with three forming New Way and two establishing Lev, which immediately merged into Likud. Later, two of the three that set up New Way resigned from the Knesset and were replaced by Centre Party members, whilst the remaining New Way MK joined Labor-Meimad. Two MKs left Yisrael BaAliyah to establish the Democratic Choice, whilst three MKs left the United Arab List; two established the Arab National Party and one formed National Unity – National Progressive Alliance. Michael Kleiner left the National Union to establish Herut – The National Movement, whilst the National Union became allied to Yisrael Beiteinu. Ahmed Tibi left Balad to establish Ta'al.

See also
1999 Israeli Labor Party primary

References

External links
Historical overview of the Fifteenth Knesset Knesset website 
Election results Knesset website

Israeli legislative
Legislative election
Legislative elections in Israel
Israeli prime ministerial elections
May 1999 events in Asia
Israel
Israel 1999
Benjamin Netanyahu

fr:Élections générales israéliennes de 1999